Abraka, is a town in Delta state, Nigeria. 
It is also home to two of the main 24 urhobo kingdoms. 
It is mostly known as a university town and has the main campus of the Delta State University located there. 
Abraka town is a favourite destination for domestic and international tourists. The Abraka beach is famous for its natural flowing spring water, and has sports recreational facilities for outdoor activities like canoeing, fishing, swimming, barbecue and picnicking.

History
Abraka was founded by a Benin Prince, Avwraka according to Abraka oral history. Avwraka (Abraka) is one of the few Urhobo socio-political units whose predecessors did not live elsewhere among non-Urhobo ethnic group before settling in Urhoboland.

Avwraka was a Prince in an Edo-speaking political group which emigrated and settled near other Urhobo people.

The contemporary main version of the historical traditions of Avwraka (Abraka) states that before Avwraka died in Otorho-Avwraka, he had two sons called Aghwa and Ivie. These are the distant ancestors of Umiaghwa and Oruarivie of Avwraka today.

The main settlements of Avwraka (Abraka) today are:
 Ekrejeta
 Ajanomi
 Urhuoka
 Urhuovie
 Erho
 Oria
 Urhuagbesa
 Umeghe
 Oteri (founded by descendants of Oruarivie)
 Otorho - Avwraka (Avwraka Inland). This is the traditional headquarters.

The construction of a link road from Agbor, through Abraka, to Sapele in 1901 increased the commercial activities and population in Abraka. On  6 May 1978, the whole of Abraka resolved to constitute themselves into a kingdom like most Urhobo kingdoms. They decided to have Chief David Oghenegueke Dafe as their Ovie (king) and Chief Joseph Ajarho Atagana from Umiaghwa as their Otota (spokesman). Recent historical development in Avwraka (Abraka) has birthed the need to divide Abraka Kingdom into Umiagwa-Abraka and Oruarive-Abraka Kingdoms. 
Hence the two separate Avwraka (Abraka) kingdoms now form a vital part of the Ethiope-East Local Government Area of Delta State to which the polity has belonged since 1976. The principal inhabitants of the city are the Urhobo people.

Climate
Abraka has a tropical wet and dry climate, with a lengthy wet season and relatively constant temperatures throughout the course of the year. Abraka's wet season runs from March through October, though August sees somewhat of a lull in precipitation. This lull nearly divides the wet season into two different wet seasons. The remaining months forms the city's dry season. Like a good portion of West Africa, Abraka experiences the harmattan between the months of November and February.

Education
Abraka is home to the prestigious Delta State University, Abraka. The Delta State University, was established in the year 1992, with its main campus at Abraka and a campus at Anwai, Asaba. With the 1995 Amended Edict, a new campus was established at Oleh. The University runs a multi-campus system with three campuses within a distance of about 200 km apart. Currently, with a student population of about 36,000 (in the 2007/08 session), the University offers a range of programmes from the full-time certificate, diploma and degree programmes to part-time evening and weekend degree programmes. The University offers post-graduate studies up to a doctoral level. A staff/student counselling centre, an e-learning centre, student accommodation and sporting facilities amidst others are available support services.

Tourism
Abraka is a destination for domestic and international tourism. It attracts numerous tourists. Abraka's Rivotel is famous for its natural flowing spring water, and has recreational facilities for outdoor activities like canoeing, fishing, swimming, barbecue. Abraka Turf and Country Club nestles at the Delta State University town of Abraka.

References

http://www-03.ibm.com/ibm/history/Professor Otite O(1973):A Study of The Urhobo of Mid-Western State Of Nigeria
http://www-03.ibm.com/ibm/history/ MrJG.Okaka(1976)Field notes:Urhobo social History, Udu report.
http://www.nigeriapostcode.com/delta-ethiope-east-abraka-erho.html
Information and Resource on Delta State University, Abraka. Can be found Here

External links 
The Abraka Town Local Website

Populated places in Delta State
Ethnic groups in Nigeria

ru:Урхобо (народ)
zh:烏爾霍博族